Antidesma pyrifolium is a species of plant in the family Phyllanthaceae. It is endemic to Sri Lanka.

References

Flora of Sri Lanka
Vulnerable plants
pyrifolium
Taxonomy articles created by Polbot